"Thinking of You" is a single released by the English rock band Status Quo in 2004. It was included on the album XS All Areas – The Greatest Hits.

Track listing 
 "Thinking of You" (Radio Mix) 3:36
 "Mystery Medley" (Live at the Montreux Jazz Festival 04/07/04) 10:18
 Trevor Dann Interview 4:52

Charts

References 

Status Quo (band) songs
2004 singles
2004 songs
Universal Music Group singles